HMV Ireland was an entertainment retailing company operated in Ireland by Hilco Capital Ireland. The company was first established by HMV Group Plc as part of their international expansion into Ireland and Canada in 1986. The first store in Ireland established was at HMV on Grafton Street in Dublin (closed since February 2013, reopened in new location in 2014, a different location in 2015 and closed again in 2016).

History

1986–2000s
HMV established its first store in Ireland in 1986 following the retailer's expansion to Canada. The first store to open was on Grafton Street which became very popular for numerous big name Irish acts performing live in the store. The retailer expanded in Dublin with a second store on Henry Street and that followed with expansion into Cork in the late 1980s before adding a store in Limerick City in the 1990s. The retailer expanded with numerous stores in the Greater Dublin region and nationwide again into Galway and Newbridge in the early to mid 2000s.

On 5 February 2011 HMV Ireland announced that its profits had fallen by almost 90% to €465,000, compared to €4.1 million the previous year.

Receivership
Following increased pressure from high rental rates in Ireland, increased legal and illegal downloading and competition from online retailers in January 2013 HMV's parent company HMV Group plc went into administration in the United Kingdom, potentially affecting its operations within Ireland, Hong Kong and Singapore. In January 2013, its 16 stores in the Republic went into receivership and as a result its Irish subsidiary ceased trading with the loss of 300 jobs. On 15 January 2013 HMV Ireland refused to accept HMV vouchers within its stores following HMV UK's administration, although HMV Ireland was a separate entity to the UK operation. The refusal of vouchers proved controversial for staff and customers, leading to speculation that HMV Ireland would also enter administration.

On 16 January 2013, HMV Ireland declared receivership, under Irish law; companies in receivership must close its stores with immediate effect and all Irish stores were closed until further notice. Deloitte Ireland was appointed receiver and are reportedly seeking a buyer for HMV's Irish stores. The National Consumer Agency in Ireland questioned the legal basis on which HMV in Ireland refused to honour gift vouchers and this criticism was later supported by accountancy agencies claiming that HMV Ireland Ltd. was not part of the HMV UK administration and refusal of vouchers was unlawful prior to receivership. Since HMV Ireland's announcement of receivership staff located at HMV stores in Limerick and Cork refused to leave the premises based on the uncertainty whether they will get paid for December and early January. Deloitte confirmed on 19 January that all staff would be paid what they were owed, and that it was attempting to sell the Irish stores. It was confirmed on 12 February 2013 that all stores within Ireland are officially closed with immediate effect and HMV has left the Irish market place. It resulted in the loss of 300 jobs.

May to September 2013: Hilco Capital Ireland reinvestment

One of Dublin's HMV stores is set to be re-opened in a deal being negotiated. Stores in other parts of Ireland are also set to reopen following successful negotiations with landlords.

On 9 June 2013 the Sunday Independent revealed Hilco Capital Ireland confirmed it has purchased HMV Ireland. Its new owners will reopen five stores in Ireland within the next six weeks. The new Irish flagship store will be based on Dublin's Henry Street. This store closed in February 2013 due to HMV Ireland Ltd. going into receivership. The Henry Street store will be the first to open and additional stores will reopen within the next six weeks these include HMV in Dublin's Liffey Valley Shopping Centre, Dundrum Town Centre and the Crescent Shopping Centre in Limerick. A fifth store is expected to open in Cork and possibly an additional store in Galway. HMV Ireland is to re-invest up to €4 million in its Irish stores and employ 100 people. It is also speculated that they hope to reopen on Dublin's Grafton Street in the future in a new location.

On 27 August 2013 Hilco Ireland announced that HMV Ireland stores would open in early September and these stores will redeem unused HMV vouchers purchased through the companies previous owners. HMV on Henry Street is the first to open on 6 September 2013 and will be opened by Irish band The Strypes. All other stores will open the following week, with the Dundrum store to open at a later date. On 29 August 2013 HMV Ireland also confirmed that 26 HMV concession stores will open in local Xtra-vision stores in Ireland. These dual branded stores (Xtra-vision / HMV) will open in Athlone, Ballina, Blackpool and Douglas in Cork, Carlow, Drogheda, Dundalk, Portlaoise, Ennis, Galway and Thurles, thus increasing HMV's presence on the Irish high street. These dual branded stores will begin rebranding from late September. HMV Ireland confirmed that it would launch services already available to customers in Canada to be made available in Ireland including HMV's localised website hmv.ie and its digital service 'The Vault'.

The Dublin Henry Street store reopened on 5 September 2013 and the Liffey Valley shopping centre, Dundrum Town Centre and Limerick Crescent shopping centre stores re-opened on 12 September 2013.

HMV opened a new branch on Grafton Street on 19 April 2014 and in Edward Square, Galway in Summer 2014.

On Saturday 13 June 2015 HMV's Grafton Street Store will relocate to 72 Grafton Street. The new store is located in the former Karen Millen Store which was previously the Grafton Cinema until the 1970s.

In early 2016, HMV Ireland confirmed the closure of its Galway City store and its store on Dublin's Grafton Street, both stores will close by end of January. This follows the closure of many Xtravision and HMV Xtravision branded stores at the end of December 2015/early January. In late January 2016 the remainder of Xtravision was liquidated.

Closure in 2016
In July 2016, Hilco announced it would be closing its remaining five stores, in order to refocus HMV in Ireland as a new digital service (HMV Digital) where customers can stream, rent or purchase music and films online. The new HMV digital service will launch in Ireland before rolling out into the UK and Canada. However, HMV failed to successfully launch its new digital service in Ireland. All stores closed between 29 and 30 August.

Product range
HMV stores stocked a range of products including audio, books, Blu-ray Discs, CDs, computer software and hardware, DVDs, video games, posters, as well as an increasing range of clothing and fashion items

See also
HMV

References

External links
HMV Ireland

Retail companies established in 1986
Retail companies disestablished in 2016
1986 establishments in Ireland
Retail companies of Ireland